My Little Juan is a 2013 Philippine fantasy-drama television series created by Rondel P. Lindayag and directed by Darnel Joy R. Villaflor and Francis E. Pasion. This series serves as a followup and a prequel to the highly successful television series, Juan dela Cruz, and stars Jaime Fabregas and Izzy Canillo,  reprising their previous respective roles as Fr. Cito and young Juan dela Cruz, with the special participation of Mylene Dizon as Juan's mother, Amelia. It premiered on ABS-CBN's Kapamilya Gold afternoon block on from May 20, 2013 to September 13, 2013 replacing May Isang Pangarap. The series deals with the themes of faith-in-oneself, identity, and love, along with issues of bullying and morality. Elements from the mythology of the Aswang has been incorporated all throughout the series, like it can take a human form and it can turn other people into an Aswang, along with the series' own mythology.

Synopsis 
The series follows a young Juan dela Cruz (Izzy Canillo) as he, with the help of Father Cito (Jaime Fabregas), prepares for his future role as the "Tagabantay" (The Guardian), while struggling to balance his goodness with the evil brewing inside him inherited from his father, an "Aswang", a humanoid creature similarly related to the Vampire, whose objective is to take over the society of men and claim it as their own. Being the Tagabantay is a role that has been passed down through generations of people who are the only ones who can wield the "Bakal na Krus" (Iron Cross). It is the duty of the Tagabantay to protect the people against the dreaded Aswang.

Cast and characters

Main cast 
 Izzy Canillo as Juan dela Cruz
 Jaime Fabregas as Fr. Ramoncito "Cito" Gonzales
 Mylene Dizon as Amelia dela Cruz

Supporting cast

Guest cast

See also 
List of programs broadcast by ABS-CBN
List of dramas of ABS-CBN
Juan dela Cruz

References

External links 

ABS-CBN drama series
Philippine action television series
Fantaserye and telefantasya
Television spin-offs
2013 Philippine television series debuts
2013 Philippine television series endings
Television series by Dreamscape Entertainment Television
Superhero television shows
Filipino-language television shows
Television shows set in the Philippines
Philippine mythology in popular culture
Television series about children